Kentucky Route 360 (KY 360) is a  state highway in Union County, Kentucky, United States, that connects mostly rural areas of Union County with Uniontown.

Route description
KY 360 begins at an intersection with KY 56 east-northeast of Spring Grove, within Union County. It travels to the north-northeast and intersects the southern terminus of KY 871. It curves to the northeast and crosses over a branch or Sugg Creek. It immediately begins paralleling this branch. Just after it leaves the branch, it has a very brief concurrency with KY 947 (Morganfield–Raleigh Road). KY 360 passes Rayburn Cemetery and Dozit Landfill before a concurrency with KY 666. After the concurrency ends, the highway heads to the north-northeast and intersects the northern terminus of KY 871. The highway curves to the east-northeast and travels under a conveyor for River View Coal. It crosses over Lost Creek and curves to the northeast. It enters Uniontown. It intersects KY 130 (Mill Street). The two highways serve as a truck route through the city. At Main Street, where the city hall is located, the highway is half a block southeast of a U.S. Post Office. It curves to the southeast and leaves the city. It passes Uniontown Cemetery and curves to the east. It crosses over Dry Fork Slough and curves to the east-northeast. KY 360 crosses over Dry Fork and curves to the east. After intersecting the southern terminus of KY 1637, it curves to the east-southeast. It continues to the southeast and meets its eastern terminus, an intersection with KY 359.

Major intersections

See also

 List of state highways in Kentucky

References

External links

0360
Transportation in Union County, Kentucky